is a Japanese racewalker. She competed in the women's 10 kilometres walk at the 1992 Summer Olympics.

References

1968 births
Living people
Place of birth missing (living people)
Japanese female racewalkers
Olympic female racewalkers
Olympic athletes of Japan
Athletes (track and field) at the 1992 Summer Olympics
Asian Games medalists in athletics (track and field)
Asian Games bronze medalists for Japan
Athletes (track and field) at the 1994 Asian Games
Medalists at the 1994 Asian Games
Japan Championships in Athletics winners
World Athletics Championships athletes for Japan